The Sinosol Group is an international project developer and provider of solar power plants, as well as a supplier of photovoltaic (PV) systems. It has experience and expertise in engineering, procurement, and the construction of many international PV projects. Sinosol projects have included a 15 MW solar power plant in Spain, a 1 MW thin film solar plant in France and a 7.4 MW plant in Germany.

See also
Photovoltaic power stations

References

Solar energy companies